Hato Rey Norte is one of the 18 barrios of the municipality of San Juan, Puerto Rico. Hato Rey Norte was part of the former municipality of Rio Piedras, before it was merged with the municipality of San Juan in 1951.

It is bounded by Hato Rey Central to the east, the districts of Gobernador Piñero and Hato Rey Sur to the south, and by Santurce to the north. The Caño Martín Peña separates Hato Rey Norte from Santurce.

Demographics 

The population of this barrio is of 16,378 residents with a population density of 4,640 residents per square mile.

Subbarrios

The barrio of Hato Rey Norte is further subdivided into four subbarrios.
El Vedado
Eleanor Roosevelt
Martín Peña
Puerto Nuevo

Landmarks and places of interest 

 Banco Popular Center and Caribbean Cinema's Fine Arts Café.
 FBI San Juan Field Office and Degetau Federal Building.
 Hiram Bithorn Stadium, a baseball park listed in the National Register of Historic Places.
 José Miguel Agrelot Coliseum, popularly known as the Choliseo, a basketball arena and San Juan's main concert venue.
 Martín Peña Channel and boardwalk or lineal park (eastern end).
 Milla de Oro, the central business district of San Juan.
 Plaza Las Américas, the largest shopping mall in the Caribbean.
 Puerto Rico Police Department Headquarters.
 Roberto Clemente Coliseum, an indoor arena and concert venue.
 United States Federal Court for the District of Puerto Rico.

Transportation 
Hato Rey Norte is part of the Milla de Oro and San Juan central business district, served by the Domenech, Roosevelt and Hato Rey metro stations. The area is also served by the Martín Peña Channel ferry, and the district is also considered a hub for the Metropolitan Bus Authority (AMA).

Gallery

See also

Hato Rey
 List of communities in Puerto Rico

References

Río Piedras, Puerto Rico
Barrios of San Juan, Puerto Rico